Acanthocobitis is a genus of freshwater ray-finned fish of the stone loach family, Nemacheilidae. Recent work has suggested that the genus be split into two with the subgenus Paracanthocobitis being raised to a full species, leaving just the type species, Acanthocobitis pavonacea, in the current genus.

Species
The following species are included in Acanthocobitis sensu lato:

Subgenus Paracanthocobitis
 Acanthocobitis (Paracanthocobitis) abutwebi R. A. Singer & Page, 2015 (Hillstream zipper loach) 
 Acanthocobitis (Paracanthocobitis) adelaideae R. A. Singer & Page, 2015 (Checkerboard zipper loach) 
 Acanthocobitis (Paracanthocobitis) aurea (F. Day, 1872) (Barred zipper loach) 
 Acanthocobitis (Paracanthocobitis) botia (F. Hamilton, 1822) (Mottled zipper loach)
 Acanthocobitis (Paracanthocobitis) canicula R. A. Singer & Page, 2015 (Houndstooth zipper loach) 
 Acanthocobitis (Paracanthocobitis) linypha R. A. Singer & Page, 2015 (Sewing needle zipper loach) 
 Acanthocobitis (Paracanthocobitis) mackenziei (B. L. Chaudhuri, 1910) (Robust zipper loach) 
 Acanthocobitis (Paracanthocobitis) maekhlongensis R. A. Singer & Page, 2015 (Maekhlong zipper loach) 
 Acanthocobitis (Paracanthocobitis) mandalayensis (Rendahl (de), 1948)  (Mandalay zipper loach) 
 Acanthocobitis (Paracanthocobitis) mooreh (Sykes, 1839) (Maharashtra zipper loach)
 Acanthocobitis (Paracanthocobitis) pictilis (Kottelat, 2012) (Ataran zipper loach) 
 Acanthocobitis (Paracanthocobitis) rubidipinnis (Blyth, 1860) (Cherryfin zipper loach)
 Acanthocobitis (Paracanthocobitis) uropthlama (Günther, 1868) (Banded mountain zipper loach)
 Acanthocobitis (Paracanthocobitis) zanalternans (Blyth, 1860) (Dwarf zipper loach)

Subgenus Acanthocobitis 
 Acanthocobitis (Acanthocobitis) pavonacea Peters, 1861 Spearfin loach

References

Nemacheilidae
Cypriniformes genera
Taxa named by Wilhelm Peters
Taxonomy articles created by Polbot